Tahlia Hickie (born 22 July 2000) is an Australian rules footballer playing for Brisbane in the AFL Women's competition (AFLW).

Hickie made her debut in the Lions' semi-final against  at Princes Park on 22 March 2020.

Honours and achievements
Individual
 AFL Women's Rising Star nominee: 2021

References

External links
 

2000 births
Living people
Sportswomen from Queensland
Australian rules footballers from Queensland
Brisbane Lions (AFLW) players
21st-century Australian women